

1978

See also 
 1978 in Australia
 1978 in Australian television

References

External links 
 Australian film at the Internet Movie Database

1978
Australia
Films